Vincent Scott Skillings (born May 3, 1959) is a former American football cornerback in the Canadian Football League for the Montreal Alouettes and Montreal Concordes. He played college football at Ohio State University.

Early years
Skillings attended Derry High School, where he practiced football and track. He was a two-way player at running back and cornerback. He received All-state honors as a senior.

He was state finalist in the 100, 220 and 440-yard dash as a senior.

College career
Skillings accepted a football scholarship from Ohio State University, to play under head coach Woody Hayes. As a freshman, he tore his right knee while playing on special teams. As a sophomore, he became a starter at safety and led the team with 6 interceptions (one returned for a touchdown).

As a junior, he was moved to cornerback and tied for second on the team with 3 interceptions. As a senior, he was tied for second on the team with 4 interceptions. At the time, his 13 career interceptions ranked fifth All-time in school history.

Professional career

Dallas Cowboys
Skillings was selected by the Dallas Cowboys in the sixth round (163rd overall) of the 1981 NFL Draft. He was released on August 18.

Montreal Alouettes (CFL)
On August 31, 1981, he was signed by the Montreal Alouettes of the Canadian Football League. He spent a few weeks with the team before being cut.

Buffalo Bills
In 1982, he was signed as a free agent by the Buffalo Bills. He was released on August 23.

Montreal Concordes (CFL)
In November 1982, he signed with the Montreal Concordes of the Canadian Football League. In 1983, he was limited while recovering from a broken ankle he suffered in the second preseason game against the Ottawa Rough Riders. On July 5, he was placed on the injured reserve list.

Los Angeles Raiders
On April 30, 1984, he was signed by the Los Angeles Raiders as a free agent. He was released before he start of the season.

Coaching career
In 1996, he was named the offensive backs coach at California University of Pennsylvania. In 2017, he was named a coach at United Senior High School in East Wheatfield Township, Indiana County, Pennsylvania.

References

External links
 Vince Skillings Stats

1959 births
Living people
American football cornerbacks
California Vulcans football coaches
Montreal Alouettes players
Montreal Concordes players
Ohio State Buckeyes football players
High school football coaches in Pennsylvania
People from Westmoreland County, Pennsylvania
Players of American football from Pennsylvania
Sportspeople from the Pittsburgh metropolitan area